Sarchul may refer to:
 Sarchul, Andika
 Sarchul, Dezful